Bonnie Gadusek was the defending champion, but did not compete this year.

Raffaella Reggi won the title by defeating Manuela Maleeva 5–7, 6–3, 7–6(8–6) in the final.

Seeds
The first eight seeds received a bye into the second round.

Draw

Finals

Top half

Section 1

Section 2

Bottom half

Section 3

Section 4

References

External links
 Official results archive (ITF)
 Official results archive (WTA)

WTA Swiss Open
European Open - Singles